Joseph Sterling Williams (born September 4, 1993) is a former American football running back. He played college football at Utah. He was drafted in the fourth round, 121st overall, by the San Francisco 49ers in the 2017 NFL Draft.

High school career
Williams was born in Allentown, Pennsylvania. He played high school football at Emmaus High School in the competitive Eastern Pennsylvania Conference in the Lehigh Valley region of eastern Pennsylvania.

College career
Williams committed to the University of Connecticut in 2012 before transferring to ASA College in New York City. In 2015, he transferred to Utah but retired after a year to focus on other aspects of his life. On October 22, 2016, however, he returned to it, setting the University of Utah's all-time record for rushing yards in a single game with 332 yards rushing against UCLA. 

In the 2016 Foster Farms Bowl against Indiana, Williams was awarded Offensive Most Valuable Player in a game where he rushed for 222 yards, scored a rushing touchdown, and accumulated 56 receiving yards. In the 2016 season at Utah, Williams rushed for 1,407 yards and ten rushing touchdowns in just nine games.

Professional career
In the 2017 NFL Draft, Williams was drafted by the San Francisco 49ers in the fourth round with the 121st overall selection.. He was the 11th running back selected in that year's draft. On September 2, 2017, he was placed on injured reserve with an ankle injury.

On August 31, 2018, Williams was waived by the 49ers.

References

External links
Utah Utes biography

1993 births
Living people
American football running backs
UConn Huskies football players
Emmaus High School alumni
Players of American football from Pennsylvania
San Francisco 49ers players
Sportspeople from Allentown, Pennsylvania
Utah Utes football players